Heretic is the seventh studio album by the Florida death metal band Morbid Angel. This would be their last under Earache Records, as the band decided not to renew its contract, and also the last to feature Pete Sandoval and with Steve Tucker until his return on 2017's Kingdoms Disdained.

The album was recorded at Diet of Worms Studios by Juan Gonzalez. Heretic is the band's first album not recorded at Morrisound Recording.

The second track, "Enshrined by Grace", is featured on The Texas Chainsaw Massacre soundtrack. It also had a music video which received airplay in the months following the album release.

Nile vocalist/guitarist Karl Sanders, played the outro guitar solo of "God of Our Own Divinity".

The song "Born Again" is actually the outro guitar solo from the song "Secured Limitations" from 2000's Gateways to Annihilation.

Track listing
The album was released in five different versions. The first simply contains Heretic in a standard CD case; the second is a box set featuring the album plus the 18-track CD Bonus Levels and a sticker—released in Germany only and limited to 10,000 copies; the third is a double-disc slipcase of both CDs—available only through US mail order and limited to 2,000 copies; the fourth features both discs in a double-CD jewel case—released in Europe only and limited to 20,000 copies; and the fifth is a 12-inch picture disc with no bonus CD limited to 1,500 copies.

Bonus tracks
The album contains additional tracks after "Born Again". Many of these are silent, while some contain guitar solos or ambiance (notably the sound effects from "Place of Many Deaths" on "Tortured Souls"). When ripped to a computer, the tracks with solos or songs have mostly comical names. The disc has 44 tracks and, according to interviews with Trey Azagthoth, the tracks' numbers and duration have some meaning.

Tracks not listed are silent. Names given are taken directly from the CD-Text on the disc.

Bonus levels
A few pressings of the album were made with an extra disc called Bonus Levels. The first six tracks are all songs off the first disc, with synthesized drums and no vocals. The remaining tracks are guitar solos.

Chart positions

Personnel

Morbid Angel
Steve Tucker – bass, vocals
Trey Azagthoth – guitars, guitar synthesizer, keyboards
Pete Sandoval – drums, piano, keyboards

Guest
Karl Sanders – the outro guitar solo of "God of Our Own Divinity"

Others
Juan "Punchy" Gonzalez – producer, mixing
Marc Sasso – cover art
Peter "Drunken Monkey" Tsakiris – design
Alex Solca – photography

References 

2003 albums
Morbid Angel albums
Earache Records albums